Mandsaur railway station is the main station in Mandsaur, a city in Madhya Pradesh, India. Its code is MDS. Mandsaur is B – category railway station of Western Railway Zone on the Ajmer — Ratlam section. The station consists of two platforms.

Mandsaur is connected to Ratlam, Ujjain via Nagda and Kota, Bundi via Chittorgarh.

References

Railway stations in Mandsaur district
Ratlam railway division
Mandsaur